Staples2Naples was the first European Banger rally, organised by StreetSafari.

History 
Staples2Naples started in 2003 when the first rally took place.

External links
 Official Staples2Naples Website
 The Three Blondes Doing Staples2Naples 2007
 Staples2Naples in the media - Channel 4
 Team MSportUK.com S2N05 (overshot by 1,804 miles)

Rally competitions in Italy